Lepashe is a village in Central District of Botswana. It is located west of Francistown, on the banks of Lepashe River. The population was 347 in 2001 census.

References

Populated places in Central District (Botswana)
Villages in Botswana